NGC 4614 is a barred lenticular galaxy in the New General Catalog. It is located in the constellation of Coma Berenices. It was discovered in 1864 by the German astronomer Heinrich d'Arrest with a 11.9 inch (11 inch) diameter lens type telescope.

References

External links 
 
 SEDS

Barred lenticular galaxies
4614
Coma Berenices
042573